Uroš Vasiljević (born July 8, 1988) is a Macedonian professional basketball player who last played for MZT Skopje of the Macedonian League.

External links
 Uroš Vasiljević Profile at eurobasket.com
 Uroš Vasiljević Profile at realgm.com
 Uroš Vasiljević Profile at aba-liga.com

1988 births
Living people
Kenyon Lords basketball players
Macedonian men's basketball players
Macedonian people of Serbian descent
Sportspeople from Skopje
Small forwards